Riley Dodge (born October 12, 1988) is an American football coach and former player. He has been head coach at Carroll Senior High School since 2018.

Early life
Riley Dodge was born on October 12, 1988. His father is head coach Todd Dodge and his mother is Elizabeth Neptune Dodge daughter of former Westlake Head Coach Ebbie Neptune.

High school career
Dodge prepped at Carroll High School in Southlake, Texas, where he was coached by his father and later Hal Wasson. Dodge played behind the former Alabama Crimson Tide quarterback Greg McElroy. As a junior, Dodge gained 4,184 yards and 54 touchdowns passing, plus 1,119 yards and 13 scores rushing, in Todd Dodge's trademark no-huddle spread offense. His 54 TD passes tie fellow Southlake Carroll alumnus Chase Wasson for third all-time in Texas high school football history.

Southlake Carroll won the 5A Texas state championship in 2006 with a 43–29 win over Austin Westlake.

Playing for coach Wasson as a senior, Dodge threw for 3,445 yards and 39 touchdowns in 2007. Southlake Carroll lost to Abilene in the regional semifinals, ending a 58-game winning streak against Texas teams.

College career
Growing up as a Texas Longhorns fan, Dodge verbally committed to play for Mack Brown in February 2007. However, he later changed his mind, and eventually signed a letter of intent to play at University of North Texas for his father. While at North Texas, he played quarterback and later moved to wide receiver.  In January 2010, he announced his intention to leave North Texas and enrolled at McNeese State University in Lake Charles where he had two years of eligibility left to play football. His father now is the head coach of Austin Westlake High School.

Later life 
On April 16, 2013, Dodge was hired at The University of Texas as a quality control quarterbacks coach.

Dodge began his high school coaching career after being hired as the offensive coordinator and quarterbacks coach in February 2015, where he joined the varsity coaching staff at Flower Mound Marcus High School in Flower Mound, Texas. He led the Marauder offense for the 2015-2017 seasons where the team posted a combined record of 17-7. This included a final ranking of #23 in the state of Texas during the 2015-16 season. Two years after Dodge's departure, Flower Mound Marcus earned a 6A, District 6 regular season championship. In March 2016 he was arrested for charges of Driving While Intoxicated in Southlake, Texas; his infant child was a passenger in the automobile. 

In April 2018, Dodge returned home to become the head coach of his alma mater, Southlake Carroll High School in Southlake, Texas. Dodge has led the Dragons to the state playoffs in every season since becoming the Carroll Head Coach and, in 2020, led the Dragons to the Texas UIL Class 6A Division 1 State Championship game. The Dragons finished as the 6A Division 1 state runner-up, beaten by his father's team, Austin Westlake, 52-34. In the 2021 campaign, Dodge led the Dragons to (14-1) record, losing to Duncanville in the semifinals of the 6A Division 1 state playoffs.

References

External links
Official biography at North Texas

1988 births
Living people
People from McKinney, Texas
American football quarterbacks
North Texas Mean Green football players
McNeese Cowboys football players